Souliloquy is an album recorded by Dick Morrissey in 1986. It was his second solo album for Coda.

Track listing 

"Clouds" (Sérgio Mendes)
"East Sunrise" (Nippy Noya, Max Middleton)
"Lord Mayo" (Traditional; arranged by Dick Morrissey)
"Blue Star Delhi (Max Middleton)
"Angel" (Bob Weston)
"Red Shoes" (Max Middleton)
"Soliloquy" (Max Middleton)

Personnel 

Dick Morrissey - Tenor/soprano saxes
Max Middleton - Keyboards
Kuma Harada - Bass guitar
Robert Ahwai - Guitar
Steve Ferrone - Drums
Danny Cummings - Percussion
Bob Weston - Lead guitar on "Angel" and "Red Shoes"
Lenny Zakatek - Vocal on "Angel"

See also 
Dick Morrissey discography

References

1986 albums
Dick Morrissey albums